Extreme points are portions of a region which are further north, south, east, or west than any other.  This is a list of extreme points in U.S. states, territories, and the District of Columbia.

Footnotes

See also
 Extreme points of the United States
 Extreme points of Canadian provinces
 List of U.S. states by elevation
 Geographic centers of the United States

References

Extreme points of the United States
United States